The 2010–11 New Jersey Nets season was the 44th season of the franchise, 35th in the National Basketball Association (NBA). This was the franchise's first season in the Prudential Center. Despite a slightly improved record, the Nets missed the playoffs for the fourth consecutive year.

Key dates
 June 10: Avery Johnson becomes the Nets' head coach.
 June 24: The 2010 NBA draft took place in New York City.
 July 1: The free agency period started.

Offseason

Draft picks

Roster

Pre-season

Game log

|- bgcolor="#ccffcc"
| 1
| October 3
| Maccabi Haifa
| 
| Derrick Favors,Anthony Morrow (14)
| Kris Humphries (12)
| Terrence Williams (6)
| Prudential Center5,174
| 1–0
|- bgcolor="#ccffcc"
| 2
| October 5
| @ Philadelphia
| 
| Brook Lopez (24)
| Kris Humphries (9)
| Terrence Williams (8)
| Roanoke Civic Center4,114
| 2–0
|- bgcolor="#ffcccc"
| 3
| October 7
| Boston
| 
| Brook Lopez (23)
| Travis Outlaw (6)
| Terrence Williams (5)
| Prudential Center8,483
| 2–1
|- bgcolor="#ccffcc"
| 4
| October 9
| Philadelphia
| 
| Brook Lopez (23)
| Derrick Favors (10)
| Devin Harris (8)
| Prudential Center6,252
| 3–1
|- bgcolor="#ffcccc"
| 5
| October 13
| @ Houston
| 
| Brook Lopez (22)
| Terrence Williams (8)
| Devin Harris (7)
| Wukesong Arena16,996
| 3–2
|- bgcolor="ffcccc"
| 6
| October 16
| Houston
| 
| Brook Lopez (20)
| Brook Lopez (9)
| Devin Harris (5)
| Guangzhou Gymnasium16,516
| 3–3
|- bgcolor="#ffcccc"
| 7
| October 19
| @ New York
| 
| Jordan Farmar (21)
| Brook Lopez (8)
| Jordan Farmar (5)
| Madison Square Garden18,895
| 3–4
|- bgcolor="#ffcccc"
| 8
| October 20
| @ Boston
| 
| Derrick Favors (16)
| Kris Humphries (8)
| Devin Harris (4)
| TD Garden18,624
| 3–5
|-

Regular season

Standings

Record vs. opponents

Game log

|- bgcolor="#ccffcc"
| 1
| October 27
| Detroit
| 
| Brook Lopez (25)
| Derrick Favors (10)
| Devin Harris (9)
| Prudential Center15,178
| 1–0
|- bgcolor="#ccffcc"
| 2
| October 29    
| Sacramento
| 
| Brook Lopez (29)
| Kris Humphries (8)
| Devin Harris (10)
| Prudential Center13,482
| 2–0
|- bgcolor="#ffcccc"
| 3
| October 31
| Miami
| 
| Brook Lopez (20)
| Derrick Favors (13)
| Devin Harris (6)
| Prudential Center17,086
| 2–1
|-

|- bgcolor="#ffcccc"
| 4
| November 3
| Charlotte
| 
| Devin Harris (19)
| Derrick Favors (8)
| Devin Harris (8)
| Prudential Center11,778
| 2–2
|- bgcolor="#ffcccc"
| 5
| November 5
| @ Orlando
| 
| Travis Outlaw (17)
| Travis Outlaw (6)
| Jordan Farmar (7)
| Amway Center18.846
| 2–3
|- bgcolor="#ffcccc"
| 6
| November 6
| @ Miami
| 
| Anthony Morrow (25)
| Anthony Morrow,Terrence Williams (7)
| Terrence Williams (9)
| American Airlines Arena19,600
| 2–4
|- bgcolor="#ffcccc"
| 7
| November 9
| Cleveland
| 
| Travis Outlaw (27)
| Troy Murphy (11)
| Devin Harris (6)
| Prudential Center10,188
| 2–5
|- bgcolor="#ccffcc"
| 8
| November 10
| @ Cleveland
| 
| Devin Harris (31)
| Kris Humphries (18)
| Devin Harris (9)
| Quicken Loans Arena20,562
| 3–5
|- bgcolor="#ffcccc"
| 9
| November 13
| Orlando
| 
| Devin Harris (26)
| Travis Outlaw,Kris Humphries (7)
| Devin Harris (8)
| Prudential Center15,086
| 3–6
|- bgcolor="#ccffcc"
| 10
| November 15
| @ L.A. Clippers
| 
| Brook Lopez (24)
| Kris Humphries (12)
| Jordan Farmar (12)
| Staples Center14,516
| 4–6
|- bgcolor="#ffcccc"
| 11
| November 17
| @ Utah
| 
| Anthony Morrow (24)
| Kris Humphries (15)
| Devin Harris (8)
| EnergySolutions Arena19,314
| 4–7
|- bgcolor="#ffcccc"
| 12
| November 19
| @ Sacramento
| 
| Kris Humphries (18)
| Kris Humphries,Brook Lopez (10)
| Devin Harris (8)
| ARCO Arena11,766
| 4–8
|- bgcolor="#ffcccc"
| 13
| November 20
| @ Denver
| 
| Brook Lopez (20)
| Derrick Favors,Kris Humphries,Brook Lopez (8)
| Jordan Farmar (5)
| Pepsi Center16,396
| 4–9
|- bgcolor="#ccffcc"
| 14
| November 23
| Atlanta
| 
| Brook Lopez (32)
| Kris Humphries (14)
| Devin Harris (9)
| Prudential Center13,010
| 5–9
|- bgcolor="#ffcccc"
| 15
| November 24
| @ Boston
| 
| Devin Harris (20)
| Kris Humphries (11)
| Jordan Farmar (7)
| TD Garden18,624
| 5–10
|- bgcolor="#ffcccc"
| 16
| November 27
| @ Philadelphia
| 
| Brook Lopez (25)
| Kris Humphries (15)
| Devin Harris (6)
| Wells Fargo Center14,150
| 5–11
|- bgcolor="#ccffcc"
| 17
| November 28
| Portland
| 
| Devin Harris (25)
| Kris Humphries (8)
| Devin Harris (8)
| Prudential Center11,448
| 6–11
|- bgcolor="#ffcccc"
| 18
| November 30
| @ New York
| 
| Brook Lopez (36)
| Kris Humphries (7)
| Jordan Farmar (4)
| Madison Square Garden19,763
| 6–12
|-

|- bgcolor="#ffcccc"
| 19
| December 1
| Oklahoma City
| 
| Jordan Farmar,Brook Lopez (28)
| Kris Humphries (15)
| Jordan Farmar (9)
| Prudential Center13,108
| 6–13
|- bgcolor="#ffcccc"
| 20
| December 3
| @ Charlotte
| 
| Travis Outlaw (21)
| Kris Humphries,Troy Murphy (8)
| Jordan Farmar (10)
| Time Warner Cable Arena12,183
| 6–14
|- bgcolor="#ffcccc"
| 21
| December 5
| Boston
| 
| Jordan Farmar (16)
| Johan Petro (9)
| Devin Harris,Damion James (3)
| Prudential Center16,196
| 6–15
|- bgcolor="#ffcccc"
| 22
| December 7
| @ Atlanta
| 
| Brook Lopez (24)
| Kris Humphries (7)
| Devin Harris (13)
| Philips Arena14,273
| 6–16
|- bgcolor="#ffcccc"
| 23
| December 9
| @ Dallas
| 
| Brook Lopez (24)
| Kris Humphries (13)
| Devin Harris,Terrence Williams (4)
| American Airlines Center19,666
| 6–17
|- bgcolor="#ffcccc"
| 24
| December 12
| L.A. Lakers
| 
| Brook Lopez (25)
| Kris Humphries (11)
| Devin Harris (10)
| Prudential Center16,561
| 6–18
|- bgcolor="#ffcccc"
| 25
| December 14
| Philadelphia
| 
| Brook Lopez (16)
| Derrick Favors,Kris Humphries (13)
| Devin Harris (6)
| Prudential Center10,151
| 6–19
|- bgcolor="#ccffcc"
| 26
| December 16
| Washington
| 
| Devin Harris (29)
| Kris Humphries (17)
| Devin Harris (9)
| Prudential Center10,764
| 7–19
|- bgcolor="#ffcccc"
| 27
| December 17
| @ Toronto
| 
| Brook Lopez (20)
| Kris Humphries (12)
| Devin Harris (6)
| Air Canada Centre14,623
| 7–20
|- bgcolor="#ccffcc"
| 28
| December 19
| Atlanta
| 
| Devin Harris (22)
| Stephen Graham (7)
| Devin Harris (8)
| Prudential Center11,295
| 8–20
|- bgcolor="#ccffcc"
| 29
| December 21
| @ Memphis
| 
| Brook Lopez (26)
| Kris Humphries (15)
| Jordan Farmar (6)
| FedExForum14,113
| 9–20
|- bgcolor="#ffcccc"
| 30
| December 22
| @ New Orleans
| 
| Devin Harris (21)
| Troy Murphy (7)
| Devin Harris (8)
| New Orleans Arena15,423
| 9–21
|- bgcolor="#ffcccc"
| 31
| December 27
| Orlando
| 
| Devin Harris (24)
| Kris Humphries (11)
| Devin Harris (6)
| Prudential Center11,514
| 9–22
|- bgcolor="#ffcccc"
| 32
| December 29
| @ Oklahoma City
| 
| Devin Harris,Brook Lopez (19)
| Kris Humphries (7)
| Ben Uzoh (5)
| Oklahoma City Arena18,203
| 9–23
|- bgcolor="#ffcccc"
| 33
| December 31
| @ Chicago
| 
| Brook Lopez (19)
| Brook Lopez (8)
| Devin Harris (9)
| United Center21,792
| 9–24
|-

|- bgcolor="#ffcccc"
| 34
| January 1
| @ Minnesota
| 
| Sasha Vujačić (22)
| Kris Humphries (14)
| Devin Harris (8)
| Target Center12,665
| 9–25
|- bgcolor="#ccffcc"
| 35
| January 5
| Chicago
| 
| Kris Humphries (20)
| Kris Humphries (11)
| Devin Harris (11)
| Prudential Center15,025
| 10–25
|- bgcolor="#ffcccc"
| 36
| January 7
| @ Washington
| 
| Jordan Farmar,Brook Lopez (14)
| Stephen Graham (9)
| Devin Harris (3)
| Verizon Center16,017
| 10–26
|- bgcolor="#ffcccc"
| 37
| January 8
| Milwaukee
| 
| Kris Humphries (22)
| Kris Humphries (8)
| Jordan Farmar (10)
| Prudential Center12,898
| 10–27
|- bgcolor="#ffcccc"
| 38
| January 12
| @ Phoenix
| 
| Sasha Vujačić (19)
| Travis Outlaw (11)
| Devin Harris (15)
| US Airways Center16,334
| 10–28
|- bgcolor="#ffcccc"
| 39
| January 14
| @ L.A. Lakers
| 
| Brook Lopez (35)
| Kris Humphries (15)
| Devin Harris (8)
| Staples Center18,997
| 10–29
|- bgcolor="#ffcccc"
| 40
| January 15
| @ Portland
| 
| Brook Lopez (32)
| Kris Humphries (10)
| Devin Harris (6)
| Rose Garden20,441
| 10–30
|- bgcolor="#ffcccc"
| 41
| January 17
| @ Golden State
| 
| Brook Lopez (20)
| Kris Humphries (10)
| Devin Harris (8)
| Oracle Arena18,563
| 10–31
|- bgcolor="#ccffcc"
| 42
| January 19
| Utah
| 
| Brook Lopez (20)
| Travis Outlaw (8)
| Devin Harris (8)
| Prudential Center13,251
| 11–31
|- bgcolor="#ccffcc"
| 43
| January 21
| Detroit
| 
| Brook Lopez (15)
| Kris Humphries (12)
| Devin Harris (9)
| Prudential Center13,316
| 12–31
|- bgcolor="#ffcccc"
| 44
| January 22
| Dallas
| 
| Brook Lopez (24)
| Kris Humphries (15)
| Devin Harris (11)
| Prudential Center14,051
| 12–32
|- bgcolor="#ccffcc"
| 45
| January 24
| Cleveland
| 
| Brook Lopez (28)
| Kris Humphries (11)
| Devin Harris (10)
| Prudential Center10,197
| 13–32
|- bgcolor="#ccffcc"
| 46
| January 26
| Memphis
| 
| Anthony Morrow (19)
| Derrick Favors (9)
| Devin Harris (9)
| Prudential Center8,866
| 14–32
|- bgcolor="#ffcccc"
| 47
| January 28
| @ Indiana
| 
| Brook Lopez (28)
| Travis Outlaw (6)
| Devin Harris (9)
| Conseco Fieldhouse11,337
| 14–33
|- bgcolor="#ffcccc"
| 48
| January 29
| @ Milwaukee
| 
| Brook Lopez (26)
| Kris Humphries (10)
| Devin Harris (16)
| Bradley Center17,173
| 14–34
|- bgcolor="#ccffcc"
| 49
| January 31
| Denver
| 
| Brook Lopez (27)
| Kris Humphries (9)
| Devin Harris (18)
| Prudential Center14,039
| 15–34
|-

|- bgcolor="#ffcccc"
| 50
| February 2
| Philadelphia
| 
| Devin Harris,Kris Humphries,Brook Lopez (16)
| Derrick Favors (11)
| Devin Harris (7)
| Prudential Center10,057
| 15–35
|- bgcolor="#ffcccc"
| 51
| February 4
| @ Detroit
| 
| Anthony Morrow (22)
| Kris Humphries (9)
| Devin Harris (13)
| The Palace of Auburn Hills17,304
| 15–36
|- bgcolor="#ffcccc"
| 52
| February 6
| Indiana
| 
| Devin Harris,Brook Lopez (13)
| Kris Humphries (9)
| Devin Harris (7)
| Prudential Center13,167
| 15–37
|- bgcolor="#ccffcc"
| 53
| February 9
| New Orleans
| 
| Sasha Vujačić (25)
| Kris Humphries (15)
| Jordan Farmar (11)
| Prudential Center13,316
| 16–37
|- bgcolor="#ccffcc"
| 54
| February 11
| @ Charlotte
| 
| Brook Lopez (31)
| Kris Humphries (14)
| Devin Harris (8)
| Time Warner Cable Arena15,386
| 17–37
|- bgcolor="#ffcccc"
| 55
| February 12
| New York
| 
| Devin Harris (22)
| Derrick Favors (14)
| Sasha Vujačić (4)
| Prudential Center18,711
| 17–38
|- bgcolor="#ffcccc"
| 56
| February 14
| San Antonio
| 
| Brook Lopez,Travis Outlaw (11)
| Brook Lopez (10)
| Jordan Farmar (7)
| Prudential Center13,433
| 17–39
|- bgcolor="#ffcccc"
| 57
| February 16
| @ Boston
| 
| Brook Lopez (18)
| Derrick Favors (7)
| Devin Harris,Sasha Vujačić (5)
| TD Garden18,624
| 17–40
|- align="center"
|colspan="9" bgcolor="#bbcaff"|All-Star Break
|- bgcolor="#ffcccc"
| 58
| February 25
| @ San Antonio
| 
| Anthony Morrow (25)
| Brook Lopez (8)
| Deron Williams (12)
| AT&T Center18,581
| 17–41
|- bgcolor="#ffcccc"
| 59
| February 26
| @ Houston
| 
| Brook Lopez (21)
| Kris Humphries (11)
| Deron Williams (17)
| Toyota Center17,209
| 17–42
|- bgcolor="#ffcccc"
| 60
| February 28
| Phoenix
| 
| Brook Lopez (28)
| Kris Humphries (15)
| Deron Williams (18)
| Prudential Center15,836
| 17–43
|-

|- bgcolor="#ccffcc"
| 61
| March 4
| Toronto
| 
| Brook Lopez (25)
| Kris Humphries (17)
| Deron Williams (11)
| O2 Arena18,689
| 18–43
|- bgcolor="#ccffcc"
| 62
| March 5
| Toronto
| 
| Brook Lopez (34)
| Kris Humphries (17)
| Deron Williams (18)
| O2 Arena18,689
| 19–43
|- bgcolor="#ccffcc"
| 63
| March 9
| Golden State
| 
| Brook Lopez (26)
| Kris Humphries (15)
| Jordan Farmar (9)
| Prudential Center13,513
| 20–43
|- bgcolor="#ccffcc"
| 64
| March 11
| L.A. Clippers
| 
| Jordan Farmar,Brook Lopez (24)
| Kris Humphries (20)
| Jordan Farmar (7)
| Prudential Center18,711
| 21–43
|- bgcolor="#ccffcc"
| 65
| March 14
| Boston
| 
| Brook Lopez (20)
| Kris Humphries (15)
| Deron Williams (9)
| Prudential Center18,711
| 22–43
|- bgcolor="#ffcccc"
| 66
| March 17
| Chicago
| 
| Brook Lopez (22)
| Kris Humphries (16)
| Deron Williams (11)
| Prudential Center18,351
| 22–44
|- bgcolor="#ffcccc"
| 67
| March 18
| @ Milwaukee
| 
| Brook Lopez (25)
| Kris Humphries (11)
| Deron Williams (9)
| Bradley Center14,563
| 22–45
|- bgcolor="#ffcccc"
| 68
| March 20
| @ Washington
| 
| Brook Lopez (21)
| Kris Humphries (17)
| Jordan Farmar (17)
| Verizon Center17,761
| 22–46
|- bgcolor="#ffcccc"
| 69
| March 21
| Indiana
| 
| Brook Lopez (20)
| Kris Humphries (14)
| Jordan Farmar,Stephen Graham (4)
| Prudential Center13,792
| 22–47
|- bgcolor="#ccffcc"
| 70
| March 23
| @ Cleveland
| 
| Kris Humphries,Brook Lopez,Sasha Vujačić (18)
| Kris Humphries (23)
| Jordan Farmar (10)
| Quicken Loans Arena18,923
| 23–47
|- bgcolor="#ffcccc"
| 71
| March 25
| @ Orlando
| 
| Anthony Morrow (19)
| Kris Humphries (10)
| Jordan Farmar (16)
| Amway Center19,087
| 23–48
|- bgcolor="#ffcccc"
| 72
| March 26
| @ Atlanta
| 
| Anthony Morrow (25)
| Johan Petro (8)
| Jordan Farmar (8)
| Philips Arena17,093
| 23–49
|- bgcolor="#ffcccc"
| 73
| March 29
| Houston
| 
| Brook Lopez (22)
| Kris Humphries (13)
| Jordan Farmar (7)
| Prudential Center13,866
| 23–50
|- bgcolor="#ffcccc"
| 74
| March 30
| @ New York
| 
| Anthony Morrow (30)
| Kris Humphries (14)
| Deron Williams (8)
| Madison Square Garden19,763
| 23–51
|-

|- bgcolor="#ffcccc"
| 75
| April 1
| @ Philadelphia
| 
| Brandan Wright (15)
| Brandan Wright (11)
| Deron Williams (7)
| Wells Fargo Center16,695
| 23–52
|- bgcolor="#ffcccc"
| 76
| April 3
| Miami
| 
| Deron Williams (18)
| Travis Outlaw (9)
| Deron Williams (9)
| Prudential Center18,711
| 23–53
|- bgcolor="#ccffcc"
| 77
| April 5
| Minnesota
| 
| Brook Lopez (30)
| Brook Lopez (12)
| Deron Williams (21)
| Prudential Center13,461
| 24–53
|- bgcolor="#ffcccc"
| 78
| April 6
| @ Detroit
| 
| Brook Lopez (39)
| Brook Lopez (7)
| Jordan Farmar (11)
| The Palace of Auburn Hills14,554
| 24–54
|- bgcolor="#ffcccc"
| 79
| April 8
| New York
| 
| Brook Lopez (27)
| Jordan Farmar (8)
| Jordan Farmar (9)
| Prudential Center18,023
| 24–55
|- bgcolor="#ffcccc"
| 80
| April 10
| @ Toronto
| 
| Brook Lopez (35)
| Brook Lopez (11)
| Jordan Farmar (7)
| Air Canada Centre17,755
| 24–56
|- bgcolor="#ffcccc"
| 81
| April 11
| Charlotte
| 
| Brook Lopez (31)
| Dan Gadzuric (8)
| Jordan Farmar (9)
| Prudential Center13,853
| 24–57
|- bgcolor="#ffcccc"
| 82
| April 13
| @ Chicago
| 
| Jordan Farmar (21)
| Johan Petro (8)
| Jordan Farmar (12)
| United Center22,420
| 24–58
|-

Player statistics

Season

|-
| 
| 73 || 18 || 24.6 || .392 || .359 || .820 || 2.4 || 5.0 || .8 || .1 || 9.6
|-
| *
| 56 || 23 || 19.5 || .511 || .000 || .612 || 5.3 || .4 || .3 || .7 || 6.3
|-
| 
| 14 || 5 || 11.9 || .415 || .000 || .385 || 3.5 || .2 || .2 || .8 || 2.8
|-
| *
| 10 || 0 || 14.6 || .417 || .235 || .550 || 2.4 || 2.5 || .9 || .0 || 5.5
|-
| 
| 59 || 28 || 16.3 || .405 || .238 || .816 || 2.1 || .7 || .2 || .0 || 3.4
|-
| *
| 3 || 0 || 1.7 || .500 || .000 || .500 || .0 || .3 || .3 || .0 || 1.0
|-
| *
| 54 || 54 || 31.9 || .425 || .300 || .840 || 2.4 || 7.6 || 1.1 || .1 || 15.0
|-
| 
| 74 || 44 || 27.9 ||style="background:#B71234;color:white;"| .527 || .000 || .665 ||style="background:#B71234;color:white;"| 10.4 || 1.1 ||.4 || 1.1 || 10.0
|-
| 
| 25 || 9 || 16.1 || .447 || .000 || .643 || 3.4 || .8 || .6 || .5 || 4.4
|-
| 
|style="background:#B71234;color:white;"| 82 ||style="background:#B71234;color:white;"| 82 || 35.2 || .492 || .000 || .787 || 6.0 || 1.6 || .6 ||style="background:#B71234;color:white;"| 1.5 ||style="background:#B71234;color:white;"| 20.4
|-
| 
| 58 || 47 || 32.0 || .450 ||style="background:#B71234;color:white;"| .423 ||style="background:#B71234;color:white;"| .897 || 3.0 || 1.2 || .3 || .1 || 13.2
|-
| *
| 18 || 4 || 16.0 || .342 || .174 || .529 || 4.2 || .9 || .4 || .1 || 3.6.
|-
| 
|style="background:#B71234;color:white;"| 82 || 55 || 28.8 || .375 || .302 || .772 || 4.0 || 1.0 || .4 || .4 || 9.2
|-
| 
| 77 || 1 || 11.6 || .445 || .000 || .536 || 2.8 || .6 || .4 || .4 || 3.5
|-
| *
| 36 || 4 || 9.8 || .441 || .000 || .357 || .8 || .3 || .1 || .2 || 1.6
|-
| *
| 4 || 3 || 6.1 || .250 || .000 || .000 || .8 || .3 || 0 || 0 || 0.5
|-
| 
| 42 || 0 || 10.4 || .424 || .375 || .589 || 1.5 || 1.6 || .3 || .2 || 3.8
|-
| *
| 56 || 17 || 28.5 || .404 || .369 || .851 || 3.3 || 2.3 || 1.0 || .1 || 11.4
|-
| 
| 6 || 3 || 19.3 || .429 || .250 || .600 || 1.8 || 1.7 ||style="background:#B71234;color:white;"| 1.2 || .0 || 3.7
|-
| *
| 12 || 12 ||style="background:#B71234;color:white;"| 38.0 || .349 || .271 || .793 || 4.6 ||style="background:#B71234;color:white;"| 12.8 ||style="background:#B71234;color:white;"| 1.2 || .2 || 15.0
|-
| *
| 10 || 0 || 20.6 || .397 || .333 || .500 || 3.6 || 3.1 || .5 || .0 || 6.7
|-
| *
| 16 || 1 || 11.5 || .407 || .000 || .824 || 3.0 || .4 || .5 || .4 || 3.6
|}

* – Stats with the Nets.

Awards and records

Awards

Records

Transactions

Trades

Free agents

Additions

Subtractions

References

New Jersey Nets season
New Jersey Nets seasons
New Jersey Nets
New Jersey Nets
21st century in Newark, New Jersey
Basketball in Newark, New Jersey